Surrealism was a cultural movement which began in the early 1920s. Well known for artwork and writing produced by group members, it also influenced the medium of film. Surrealist films include Un chien andalou and L'Âge d'Or by Luis Buñuel and Dalí; Buñuel went on to direct many more films, with varying degrees of surrealist influence.

Modern films influenced by surrealism
The animated films of Isao Takahata began to have broad international influence in the 1970s. Experimental works by the anime production company Gainax tend to contain surreal elements, notably Hideaki Anno's movie The End of Evangelion. Angel's Egg, produced by Mamoru Oshii and artist Yoshitaka Amano, is perhaps the most notable example of surrealist influence in anime.

American directors
David Lynch (Eraserhead, Mulholland Drive, and Inland Empire)

Canadian directors
Denis Villeneuve (Enemy)

Guy Maddin (Brand Upon the Brain, My Winnipeg)

Eastern European directors

 Wojciech Has (The Saragossa Manuscript, and The Hour-Glass Sanatorium)

New Asian directors

 Kim Ki-duk (Spring, Summer, Fall, Winter... and Spring, Real Fiction, Time, 3-Iron, Breath, Dream)

See also 
 New French Extremity

References

Notes

Further reading 
 Le Cinéma des Surréalistes, ed. by Henri Béhar, Lausanne : L'age d'homme, 2004.
 Richardson, Michael. Surrealism and Cinema. Paperback edition. Oxford: Berg, 2006. .
 Short, Robert. The Age of Gold: Surrealist Cinema. Creation Books, 2003. .
 Williams, Linda. Figures of Desire: A Theory and Analysis of Surrealist Film. Paperback edition. University of California Press, 1992. .

External links 
 Surrealist Cinema at FilmReference.com
 Film glossary definition for: "Surrealism" at Allmovie
 List of Surrealist Films at Allmovie
 Surrealism Information at Klinkov Valeriy
 Surrealism and the Cinema (PDF) at Godnose.co.uk
 Harvard Film Archive - Adventures in Surrealism at Harvard University
 Aesthetics and Philosophy of Film - Surrealism and Dada at Harvard University
 The Surrealist Conspirator: An Interview With Jan Svankmajer at AWN.com

Surrealism
Surrealism